Waterloo is an unincorporated community located in Howard County in the U.S. state of Maryland. Located at the intersection of Waterloo Road and Washington Boulevard, the neighborhood is encompassed mostly by Jessup and partially by Elkridge.

History
Spurrier's Tavern was a prominent location along the post road from Philadelphia to Georgetown. During the American Revolution, Spurrier's tavern was significant as a supply and resting point for the Continental Army; George Washington was a frequent visitor. It became the central meeting place of the Elk Ridge Militia. The tavern was renamed to "Waterloo" in 1815 by the innkeeper after the Battle of Waterloo. Hence, the area around the tavern followed the name of "Waterloo".

The greater Waterloo area is now referenced as Jessup. The Maryland State Police Waterloo barracks retain the old name of the community.

Neighborhoods
 Cedar Villa Heights, a mid twentieth century neighborhood located off Cedar Avenue. 
 Dorset Gardens at Blue Stream, a new townhouse community located adjacent to the U.S. 1 Flea Market. 
 Howard Square, a major mixed-use development initiated in 2013 located across from the Waterloo Barracks. 
 Lark Brown, a townhouse and commercial community located on Old Waterloo Road and Lark Brown Road.
 Mission Place, an apartment complex on Mission Road and Washington Boulevard 
 Montevideo, an established residential community located at the crossroads of Montevideo Road and Forest and Wigley Avenues. 
 Ridgely's Run, a small light residential neighborhood with a community center located off of Mission Road.

Education
Currently, no schools exist in the immediate area of Waterloo. The closest schools include Deep Run Elementary School on Old Waterloo Road, Thomas Viaduct Middle School in Oxford Square, Bollman Bridge Elementary School and Patuxent Valley Middle School in Savage.

In 2016, funding has been requested to construct a new high school on the Mission Road Quarry Site, currently owned by Savage Stone. The school would alleviate crowding along the Route 1 Corridor.

Industry
Waterloo includes a number of large industrial centers.
 East Columbia Marketpace
 Maryland Wholesale Food Market
 Maryland Seafood Market
 US 1 Flea Market

Public transit
Waterloo is 1.9 miles (a four-minute drive) from Jessup station (MARC Camden Line). The area is also served by a number of bus routes that interchange at the Maryland Wholesale Food Market Transportation Hub. They include RTA 408/Gold, 409/Purple, 410/Silver and MTA 320.

References

Unincorporated communities in Maryland
Unincorporated communities in Howard County, Maryland